Kentucky Route 1319 (KY 1319) is a  state highway in the U.S. state of Kentucky. Its western terminus is at KY 44 in Mount Washington and its eastern terminus is at KY 3192 south of Wilsonville.

Major junctions

References

1319
1319
1319